Charles Michael Amato (born June 26, 1946) is a former American football coach and former player. He was most recently the defensive coordinator for the Akron Zips football team.  He served as the head football at North Carolina State University from 2000 to 2006, compiling a record of 49–37. On January 17, 2007, Amato returned to Florida State, where he had coached as assistant for nearly two decades before moving to NC State, as executive associate head coach and linebackers coach, a position he held for three seasons.

Early life and education
Amato was born in Easton, Pennsylvania in the Lehigh Valley region of the state. He graduated from Easton Area High School, where boxer Larry Holmes was one of his classmates. Amato attended North Carolina State University, where he graduated with a Bachelor of Science in mathematics in 1969 and a master's degree in education in 1973.

At North Carolina State, Amato was a three-year letter winner in both football and wrestling. He played linebacker on the 1965 team that won an Atlantic Coast Conference co–championship and posted two undefeated seasons as a wrestler, winning two ACC titles at heavyweight in 1966 and at the  weight class in 1968.

Coaching career

Easton High School
Following his graduation from North Carolina State, Amato spent two years as an assistant coach at his high school alma mater, Easton High School.

North Carolina State
In 1971, Amato began a nine-year stint as an assistant coach with North Carolina State, working under Al Michaels, Lou Holtz, and Bo Rein.

Arizona and Florida State
He then spent two seasons at the University of Arizona (1980 and 1981), where he served as the linebackers coach. He then joined Florida State University, where he spent 18 years in various defensive football coaching capacities, including that of assistant head coach for 14 years. At Florida State, he was defensive line coach for 14 years and spent four seasons as linebacker coach.

North Carolina State head coach
In 2002, Amato was elected to the American Football Coaches Association Board of Trustees.

Amato accumulated an overall record of 49–37, including a record of 34–17 during the four-year period from 2000 through 2003 while Philip Rivers was the starting quarterback. Amato's most successful season was in 2002 when the Wolfpack defeated Notre Dame in the Gator Bowl to cap off an 11–win season in which his team finished No. 12 in the AP Poll.

After Rivers graduated, Amato's NC State teams finished 5–6 in 2004, 7–5 in 2005, and 3–9 in 2006.

On November 26, 2006, Amato was fired by NC State athletics director Lee Fowler after a seven–game losing streak to lose the 2006 season. Noted losses include an upset by the Akron Zips (5–7), a third straight loss to the North Carolina Tar Heels (3–9), and a loss at home to the East Carolina Pirates (7–5). Highlights of the 2006 season include wins against the Boston College Eagles and the Florida State Seminoles. In a statement, Fowler acknowledged Amato's "excitement and enthusiasm." This enthusiasm fueled an $87 million renovation to Carter–Finley Stadium. Nonetheless, mediocre 2005 and 2006 seasons led to the decision remove Amato and "to take the program in a new direction."

Florida State
In 2007, Amato returned to Florida State University as executive associate head coach and linebackers coach. In December 2009 with the retirement of Bobby Bowden, Amato was notified by new Florida State Head Coach Jimbo Fisher that he will not be retained on staff. Amato coached the 2010 Gator Bowl game and was subsequently released from the Florida State program.  In December 2009, Amato was diagnosed with neck and throat cancer.  After a successful six week treatment, he vowed to return to coaching in 2011.

Akron
Amato returned to coaching for the 2012 season as the Associate Head Coach and Defensive Coordinator under Terry Bowden. Amato retired from Akron in February 2018.

Head coaching record

ACC championships
Amato has been a part of 11 ACC championships, one as a player at North Carolina State (1965), two as an assistant coach for North Carolina State (1973 and 1979), and eight consecutive seasons at Florida State (1992 through 1999).

References

External links
 Akron profile

1946 births
Living people
American football linebackers
Akron Zips football coaches
Arizona Wildcats football coaches
Florida State Seminoles football coaches
NC State Wolfpack football coaches
NC State Wolfpack football players
High school football coaches in Pennsylvania
Easton Area High School alumni
Sportspeople from Easton, Pennsylvania
Players of American football from Pennsylvania